Vilde is both a surname and a feminine given name. Notable people with the name include:

Surname
Ain Vilde (born 1942), Estonian ice yachter and sailor
Boris Vildé (1908–1942), French linguist
Eduard Vilde (1865–1933), Estonian writer and diplomat
Iryna Vilde (1907–1982), Ukrainian writer
Raimonds Vilde (born 1962), Latvian volleyball player and coach
Ričmonds Vilde (born 1990), Latvian basketball player

Given name
Vilde Frang (born 1986), Norwegian classical violinist
Vilde Ingstad (born 1994), Norwegian handball player
Vilde Johansen (born 1994), Norwegian handball player
Vilde Lockert (born 1970), Norwegian singer and musician
Vilde Nilsen (born 2001), Norwegian Paralympic cross-country skier and biathlete

Estonian-language surnames
Norwegian feminine given names
Latvian-language surnames